The Nepa is a river in Irkutsk Oblast, Russia. It is a left tributary of the Nizhnyaya Tunguska.

References

External links 
 Article in Great Soviet Encyclopedia

Rivers of Irkutsk Oblast